Indian Institutes of Science Education and Research (IISERs) are a group of premier public research institutions in India. The institutes were established by the Government of India through the Ministry of Human Resource Development (MHRD) to provide collegiate education in basic sciences coupled with research at the undergraduate level. The institutes were formally established by the Parliament of India through the National Institutes of Technology, Science Education and Research (Amendment) Act, 2010 (an amendment to the National Institutes of Technology Act, 2007). Seven IISERs have been established across the country, namely IISER Kolkata in West Bengal, IISER Pune in Maharashtra, IISER Mohali in Punjab, IISER Bhopal in Madhya Pradesh, IISER Thiruvananthapuram in Kerala, IISER Tirupati in Andhra Pradesh, and IISER Berhampur in Odisha. All IISERs were declared as Institutes of National Importance by the Parliament of India in 2012, to promote them as leading institutions in the country in the field of basic sciences along with its sister institutes like Indian Institute of Science, Bangalore and National Institute of Science Education and Research, Bhubaneswar.

Institutes 
The IISERs are located in the following locations:

Future institutes
 IISER Nagaland. A new IISER in Nagaland was announced in the 2015-16 budget. Initially the Nagaland government suggested a different institute (SPA - School of Planning and Architecture) instead of an IISER. After many years, in 2021  and 2022, the Nagaland state government has shown renewed interest on establishing this earlier announced IISER in Nagaland.

Locations

Indian Institute of Science Education and Research, Pune has started functioning from the National Chemical Laboratory Pune campus. Its campus has mostly been developed. The labs, lecture hall complexes, main buildings, and the hostels have been set up in the permanent campus.

Indian Institute of Science Education and Research, Mohali has started functioning from the Mahatma Gandhi State Institute of Public Administration complex in Sector 26 Chandigarh. The foundation stone for its permanent campus was laid in September 2006 by the Prime Minister of India, Manmohan Singh. It started functioning at its permanent campus at Sector 81, Mohali.

Indian Institute of Science Education and Research, Bhopal started functioning from the ITI Gas Rahat Building Govindpura Bhopal. The institute was moved to its main campus in Bhauri in August 2012.

Indian Institute of Science Education and Research, Thiruvananthapuram started functioning recently from its own permanent campus at Vithura, which is 40 km from Thiruvananthapuram city. Earlier, it was functioning from a temporary campus at the College of Engineering, Trivandrum.

Indian Institute of Science Education and Research, Tirupati started functioning from a transient campus at Mangalam, Tirupati about 7 km from the city in 2015. The permanent campus has been planned to be constructed at Yerpedu, about a half-an-hour away from the city in a plot of 250 acres (1 km2) near the foothills of the Saptagiri ranges and Phase-1 of the construction is to expected to be completed by 2019.

Indian Institute of Science Education and Research, Berhampur commenced in Odisha in 2016. It is functioning from a transit campus at Government ITI. Its permanent campus is being built at Laudigam, near the sea, 20 km from Berhampur, Odisha.

Academics and admission
As of August 2022, IISERs admit 1734 in total each year for their dual degree BS-MS Program. For each channel of admission below, additional cut-off criteria of respective IISERs are applicable. Candidates satisfying any of the following criteria are eligible for applying:

JEE (Advanced) channel: Candidates in General category securing a rank within 15000 in the Common Rank List (CRL) of the JEE Advanced are eligible to apply. For candidates belonging to reserved category (OBC Non-Creamy Layer, SC, ST, Persons with Disability (PwD)), their category rank should be within 15000.
IISER Aptitude Test (IAT) channel (also known as the SCB channel): Admission to at least 50% of the seats in IISER happens through the IAT exam. It covers physics, chemistry, math and biology; students have to attend all four sections. Candidates must have taken at least three among Physics, Chemistry, Biology and Mathematics during their higher secondary course.

References

Science education in India